Karshevitoye is a rural locality (a selo) and the administrative center of Karshevitskoye Rural Settlement, Leninsky District, Volgograd Oblast, Russia. The population was 397 as of 2010. There are 7 streets.

Geography 
Karshevitoye is located on the left bank of the Volga River, 40 km southeast of Leninsk (the district's administrative centre) by road. Zubarevka is the nearest rural locality.

References 

Rural localities in Leninsky District, Volgograd Oblast